Maxwell "Max" Woosnam (6 September 1892 – 14 July 1965) was a British sportsman who is sometimes referred to as the 'Greatest British sportsman' in recognition of his achievements.

Among his achievements were winning an Olympic gold and silver in tennis at the 1920 Summer Olympics, winning the doubles at Wimbledon, compiling a 147 break in snooker, making a century at Lord's Cricket Ground, captaining the British Davis Cup team, captaining Manchester City F.C. finishing ultimately runners-up for the Football League Championship in 1920–21, and captaining the England national football team.

Background
Max Woosnam was born at Liverpool, the son of Maxwell Woosnam, a clergyman who served as canon of Chester and Archdeacon of Macclesfield, and his wife Mary Seeley, daughter of Hilton Philipson. The Woosnam family were landed gentry, of Cefnllysgwynne, Brecknockshire, Wales, originally of Montgomeryshire. Woosnam spent most of his childhood in Aberhafesp, Mid Wales. He attended Winchester College, where he captained the golf and cricket teams, and also represented the school at football and squash. As a schoolboy, he made scores of 144 and 33 not out for a Public Schools XI while playing against the Marylebone Cricket Club (MCC) at Lord's.

In 1911, Woosnam went up to Cambridge University. A member of Trinity College, he represented the university at football, cricket, lawn tennis, real tennis and golf (being a scratch golfer), becoming a quadruple Blue.

After Cambridge, Woosnam played amateur football for the then highly successful teams Corinthians and Chelsea.

In the First World War, he fought alongside Siegfried Sassoon on the western front and in the Gallipoli Campaign. Woosnam took part in a number of wartime sporting events, including football matches between a team of enlisted Corinthians players and Aldershot Command, and a Military vs Queen's Club tennis match.

Corinthian FC
Straight from his University years, Max was chosen to travel on the Corinthians tour of Brazil in the summer of 1913. Managing the tour's first goal, against Rio de Janeiro, he also scored against Paulistano and made quite a name for himself. In 1914, he again set sail with the Corinthians for Brazil...however this tour was cancelled when still at sea, the side discovered War had been declared at home. At once, the Corinthians decided, true to their ethos that there was more to life than just sport, to return and join the army. After a quick stop in Rio, allowing the players a brief walk around the town, they set sail for home. Dodging German U-Boats and torpedo fire, they eventually made it back to England. For Max, it would be his last adventure abroad with Corinthian FC.

Post-war

After the war, Woosnam continued his amateur sporting career, taking part in several sporting events. Woosnam was a finalist in the 1919 All England Plate tournament, a tennis competition held at the Wimbledon Championships, consisting of players who were defeated in the first or second rounds of the singles competition. Following a defeat of Woosnam while representing Cambridge University in a tennis match against Queen's Club in April 1919, the Times remarked that "Woosnam is a player of many games, and he could excel at tennis if he could devote enough time to the game... ...tennis is a mistress who must be constantly wooed." However, Woosnam continued to divide his attention; he played football for Chelsea either side of the Queen's Club match, captaining the team. His performance for Chelsea led to selection for a North versus South international trial match. Once the football season finished, Woosnam took part in several tennis tournaments. He won both the singles and doubles titles in the Cambridge University tournament, and entered Wimbledon for the first time. His tennis form in 1919 led The Times correspondent to describe his partnership with Noel Turnbull as a "doubles team of promise". Woosnam declined the opportunity to become a professional sportsman, finding the idea 'vulgar'.

Manchester City
Upon moving to Manchester, he signed for Manchester City on amateur terms. He made his debut on 1 January 1920 against Bradford City, a match that also saw the debut of Sam Cookson. Initially he played only home matches due to other commitments. However, when Manchester City, without Woosnam, suffered a shock 3–0 FA Cup defeat to Leicester City at the end of the month, some supporters blamed Woosnam's employers, Crossley Brothers. As a result, the engineering firm ordered Woosnam not to miss another game.

Playing at centre half, Woosnam eventually became Manchester City captain at the recommendation of his teammates. This was highly unusual for an amateur among professionals. Eventually his success allowed him to play for England (both for the amateur team and as a full international as captain). Woosnam was also selected to captain the British football team at the Olympics, but refused, having already committed himself to the tennis team. He continued other sporting endeavours outside of football however, winning doubles titles at Wimbledon and the Olympics, and captaining the Great Britain Davis Cup team.

Northwich Victoria
Woosnam had been working for chemical company ICI in Winnington, Northwich, and, while still being on Manchester City's books, he played for Winnington Park and then for Northwich Victoria in the Cheshire County League. He made his debut for Northwich on Christmas Day, 1924, in a derby match against Witton Albion, resulting in a 3–0 victory for Northwich. He sometimes captained the side, before ending his football career in February 1926 due to injuries and other commitments.

Death and legacy

He was appointed to the board of ICI, and died in 1965 of respiratory failure, having been a heavy smoker all his life.

His life is chronicled in the book All Round Genius – The Unknown Story of Britain's Greatest Sportsman, by Mick Collins.

Woosnam's uncle, Hylton Philipson, was a cricketer and played five Test matches for England.

He once defeated actor and film director Charlie Chaplin at table tennis, playing with a butter knife instead of a bat.

Besides being a pioneer for table tennis, he was very accomplished at snooker, once achieving a maximum break of 147.

Jane Percy, Duchess of Northumberland, is Woosnam's sororal grandniece.

Woosnam had three children: Denise Woosnam who was engaged to Peter Pease, and a friend of Richard Hillary (Author of The Last Enemy; Max, and Penny.

See also
 C. B. Fry, Cuthbert Ottaway and Alfred Lyttelton — three similar sporting polymaths.

References

1892 births
1965 deaths
English people of Welsh descent
People educated at Winchester College
Alumni of Trinity College, Cambridge
Sportspeople from Liverpool
Free Foresters cricketers
Footballers from Liverpool
English footballers
Association football defenders
Corinthian F.C. players
Chelsea F.C. players
Manchester City F.C. players
Northwich Victoria F.C. players
English Football League players
England international footballers
Tennis people from Merseyside
English male tennis players
English Olympic medallists
Tennis players at the 1920 Summer Olympics
Tennis players at the 1924 Summer Olympics
Olympic gold medallists for Great Britain
Olympic silver medallists for Great Britain
Olympic tennis players of Great Britain
Wimbledon champions (pre-Open Era)
Olympic medalists in tennis
Grand Slam (tennis) champions in men's doubles
Medalists at the 1920 Summer Olympics
English cricketers
Cambridge University cricketers
Cheshire cricketers
Snooker players from Liverpool
Cricketers from Liverpool
British Army personnel of World War I
Royal Welch Fusiliers officers
Montgomeryshire Yeomanry officers
British male tennis players